The 1999 Richmond Kickers season was the Richmond Kickers' seventh season of existence, and their third consecutive season in the A-League, the second division of the American soccer pyramid from 1995 until 2004.

Background

Roster 
The following players played for the Kickers during the 1999 season.

Competitions

A-League

Standings

Results summary

Results by round

Match results

A-League Playoffs

U.S. Open Cup

Statistics

Transfers

References 

Richmond Kickers
1999
Richmond Kickers